Baca Municipality (In the Yucatec Maya Language: “water in the shape of a horn”) is one of the 106 municipalities in the Mexican state of Yucatán containing  (118.78 km2) of land and located roughly 32 km east of the city of Mérida.

History
In 1441 following the fall of Mayapan, the area fell within the provinces of Ceh Pech and after the conquest became part of the encomienda system. During the conquest, the batab (chief), Ah-Op-Pech, was baptized and took the name Ambrosio Pech, simultaneously being appointed as governor. He was succeeded by his son Pedro Pech in 1567. In 1704, the encomendero was Pedro Cepeda y Lira II, who was responsible for 1548 native inhabitants.

On 15 October 1881, the village became Villa Baca. In 1900, the station of Tixkunheil was categorized as a village. In 1912, San Antonio Tzutzá and its annex "Yaxnic" are joined with Baca municipality. In 1921, the Villa was dissolved and the land was returned to the ejido.

Governance
The municipal president is elected for a three-year term. The town council has seven aldermen who serve as councilors for ecology, parks and public gardens; public safety; public works; public health; cemeteries; sanitation; and nomenclature.

Communities
The head of the municipality is Baca, Yucatán. Within its municipal jurisdiction are eleven communities. Minor communities are Unidad de Riego Boxactún, Rancho Kiiché, Hacienda Kuxúb, San Carlos, San José Novelo, Santa Cruz Collí, Santa María and Santo Domingo. Three locations are considered important communities. The three major population areas are shown below:

Local festivals
Every year from 1 to 3 May, Baca holds a fiesta in honor of the Holy Cross. Also in May from the 15 to 19, is an annual festival for San Isidro Labrador.

Tourist attractions
 Our Lady of the Assumption Church
 Hacienda Hili
 Hacienda Kancabchén
 Hacienda Sacapuc
 Hacienda San Jose, houses Thai restaurant and  Fundebien Charitable Foundation's cancer treatment center
 Hacienda Santa María
 Hacienda Siniltum

References

Municipalities of Yucatán